The Nashville Post Office is a historic post office building located at 220 North Main Street in Nashville, Howard County, Arkansas.

The post office was built during 1936–1937.

Description 
It is a single-story brick building, roughly square in shape, with very restrained Art Deco and PWA Moderne styling.  The main entrance (facing west) is flanked by pilasters, and topped by two courses of windows also flanked by pilasters, each stepped back from the lower level.

The public lobby area inside is decorated with a mural, painted in 1939 by John Tazewell Robertson, entitled "Peach Growing". The mural was funded by the Treasury Section of Fine Arts.

The building was listed on the National Register of Historic Places in 1998.

See also 

National Register of Historic Places listings in Howard County, Arkansas
List of United States post offices

References

External links 
Encyclopedia of Arkansas History & Culture entry

Nashville, Arkansas
National Register of Historic Places in Howard County, Arkansas
Post office buildings on the National Register of Historic Places in Arkansas
Government buildings completed in 1937
Art Deco architecture in Arkansas
PWA Moderne architecture
1937 establishments in Arkansas
Individually listed contributing properties to historic districts on the National Register in Arkansas